William de Fors or Forz may refer to:

 William de Forz (died 1195)
 William de Forz, 3rd Earl of Albemarle
 William de Forz, 4th Earl of Albemarle